Sisonke Msimang is a South African writer, activist and political analyst based in Perth, Western Australia, whose focus is on race, gender, and politics. She is known for her memoir Always Another Country:  A memoir of exile and home (2017) and The Resurrection of Winnie Mandela (2018), a biography of anti-apartheid activist Winnie Madikizela-Mandela.

Early life and education
Msimang was born in Zambia, where her South African freedom fighter father, Mavuso ("Baba"), had gone into exile, along with many other members of the then banned organisation the African National Congress. Her mother, Ntombi, was a Swazi accountant, and Sisonke grew up within the community in exile, along with sisters Mandla and Zeng.

Msimang grew up around South African freedom fighters such as her father and great-uncle. Her father was a leading member of uMkhonto we Sizwe (MK), the armed wing of the African National Congress (ANC), in the 1960s, and her great uncle was one of the founding members of the ANC. Their home in Zambia would be filled with people who came from South Africa who all urged Mandela to be released from prison. The family also lived in Kenya and Canada.

Msimang earned a Bachelor of Arts in politics and communication studies at  Macalester College in Saint Paul, Minnesota, and after graduating was anxious to go back to South Africa (where her family had returned after apartheid was abolished in the early 1990s), and returned in 1997. She decided to begin a career in human rights and social justice, which brought her to become an activist.

She obtained a master's degree in political science from the African Gender Institute at the University of Cape Town.

Career
Msimang worked with UNAIDS to help forge HIV/AIDS policies specifically relating to African women and girls, and became executive director of the Open Society Initiative for Southern Africa (OSISA), stepping down from that role in 2012.  She was the Executive Director of the Open Society Initiative for Southern Africa until November 2012.  In June 2103, she took up a senior role in policy development at the Sonke Gender Justice Network, which works with men and boys in promoting gender equality.

Msimang has held fellowships at Yale University, the Aspen Institute and the University of the Witwatersrand in Johannesburg.

She has been both storyteller and facilitator for The Moth and TED events, has hosted and participated in several Doha Debates, and in 2020 was the Literature and Ideas curator for Perth Writers Week. She won the Western Australian Writer's Fellowship at the 2020 Western Australian Premier's Book Awards.

 Msimang is Head Story Trainer at the Centre for Stories in Perth.

Works

In 2017 Always Another Country:  A memoir of exile and home was published in South Africa, with the Australian edition published the following year. a memoir in which she describes her childhood and living in different countries, including what South Africa was like when she returned to it. Written after the sudden death in 2014 of her beloved mother Ntombi, who had championed microfinance for female entrepreneurs in South Africa, the book was highly praised by authors Tim Winton, Njabulo S. Ndebele and Alice Pung, and earned accolades such the New York Times 2018 staff favourite of 2018 and CBC's Best International Non-fiction of 2018. She writes in it about her upbringing among the ANC exiles: "Reft of a physical place in this world we can call home, exile makes us love the idea of South Africa. We are bottle-fed the dream: South Africa is not simply about non-racialism and equality but something much more profound".

The next year she wrote The Resurrection of Winnie Mandela, an investigation of the rise and fall of anti-apartheid activist and ex-wife of Nelson Mandela, Winnie Madikizela-Mandela. She has written for a range of international publications such as The New York Times, The Daily Maverick, The Guardian, and Washington Post.

Personal life
In 2014, Msimang moved to Perth, Western Australia, where she lives with her Australian-born husband and two children.

References

External links
 

Living people
South African writers
South African activists
Australian women activists
21st-century Australian women writers
21st-century Australian writers
Year of birth missing (living people)